Zafra is a large genus of sea snails in the family Columbellidae, the dove snails.

Species
, there are around 80 species within the genus Zafra:

 Zafra aequatorialis 
 Zafra alternata 
 Zafra altispira 
 Zafra ambonensis 
 Zafra atrata 
 Zafra australensis 
 Zafra babylonica 
 Zafra bilineata 
 Zafra brevissima 
 Zafra brunneastriata 
 Zafra cinnamomea 
 Zafra darwini 
 Zafra debilis 
 Zafra dejugis 
 Zafra digglesi 
 Zafra exilis 
 Zafra farasanensis 
 Zafra fuscolineata 
 Zafra fuscomaculata 
 Zafra geyserensis 
 Zafra gracilenta 
 Zafra hahajimana 
 Zafra hedleyi 
 Zafra hervieri 
 Zafra kaicherae 
 Zafra kermadecensis 
 Zafra marisrubris 
 Zafra melitoma 
 Zafra microstoma 
 Zafra minuta 
 Zafra mitriformis 
 Zafra morini 
 Zafra niasensis 
 Zafra nukuhiva 
 Zafra obesula 
 Zafra ocellatula 
 Zafra ornata 
 Zafra padangensis 
 Zafra parilis 
 Zafra paulina 
 Zafra phaula 
 Zafra pumila 
 Zafra rapanuiensis 
 Zafra rufopiperata 
 Zafra salutaris 
 Zafra savignyi 
 Zafra saviniae 
 Zafra selasphora 
 Zafra semiclatriata 
 Zafra seminulum 
 Zafra smithi 
 Zafra stricosa 
 Zafra subvitrea 
 Zafra succinea 
 Zafra taylorae 
 Zafra townsendi 
 Zafra troglodytes 
 Zafra ulinganensis 
 Zafra vercoi 
 Zafra vexillum

References

 
Gastropod genera
Taxa named by Arthur Adams (zoologist)